Sedotti e bidonati (Italian for "Seduced and cheated") is a 1964 comedy film written and directed by Giorgio Bianchi and starring the comic duo Franco and Ciccio.

Plot

Cast 

Franco Franchi as Franco La Capra
Ciccio Ingrassia as  Ciccio La Capra
  Mia Genberg as Mia
 Pia Genberg as  Pia
 Alberto Bonucci as Arturo 
 Leopoldo Trieste as  Don Marcuzzo 
 Elena Nicolai as The Baroness 
  Alfredo Marchetti as  Sasà  
 Miranda Martino as Alfonso's Widow  
 Pietro De Vico as The Master Builder 
 Oreste Palella as The Inspector
 Lino Banfi as Cousin Pasquale

References

External links

Sedotti e bidonati at Variety Distribution

Films directed by Giorgio Bianchi
Italian buddy comedy films
1960s buddy comedy films
Films about twin sisters
Films scored by Carlo Rustichelli
1964 comedy films
1964 films
1960s Italian-language films
1960s Italian films